The International Prize for Arabic Fiction (IPAF), also known as "the Arabic Booker," is regarded as the most prestigious and important literary prize in the Arab world.  

Its aim is to reward excellence in contemporary Arabic creative writing and to encourage the readership of high-quality Arabic literature internationally through the translation and publication of winning and shortlisted novels in other major languages. In addition to the prize itself, IPAF supports other literary initiatives. In 2009, IPAF launched its inaugural nadwa (writers’ workshop) for emerging writers of fiction in Arabic.

The prize is administered by the Booker Prize Foundation in London, and is currently funded by Department of Culture and Tourism, Abu Dhabi (DCT).

Each year, the winner of the prize receives US$50,000, and the six shortlisted authors receive US$10,000 each.

Rules and entry 
Full Rules of Entry are available to view here.

Trustees 
Yasir Suleiman CBE, Professor of Arabic, University of Cambridge, Chair of Trustees
Evelyn Smith, Booker Prize Foundation, Company Secretary
Isobel Abulhoul OBE, CEO, Emirates Literature Foundation
Yassin Adnan, Moroccan journalist, broadcaster and writer
Abdulla Majed Al Ali, executive director of the UAE national archive, columnist, formerly involved in a number of cultural initiatives in the UAE, including the Sheikh Zayed Book Award, the Kalima Translation Project, the Abu Dhabi Book Fair and Abu Dhabi libraries
Nujoom Alghanem, poet, script writer and a multi-award-winning Emirati filmmaker
Rasheed El-Enany, Professor Emeritus of the University of Exeter
Omar Ghobash, Emirati author, businessman, and diplomat
Rana Idriss, Director of publisher Dar al-Adab, Beirut
Michel S. Moushabeck, Founder and President of Interlink Publishing Group, Inc., writer, editor, and musician, USA
Zaki Nusseibeh, UAE Minister of State
Sherif-Joseph Rizk, Director of publishing house Dar al-Tanweer, Egypt
Ahdaf Soueif, author and political and cultural commentator
Jonathan Taylor, former chair of the Booker Prize Foundation
Fleur Montanaro, Prize Administrator

Winners and nominees
 = winner

2008 
The winner was announced on 10 March 2008. The shortlist was announced on 29 January 2008, chosen from 131 entries.

2009 
The winner was announced on 16 March 2009. The shortlist was announced on 10 December 2008. The longlist was announced on 11 November 2008, chosen from 121 entries.

2010 
The winner was announced on 2 March 2010. The shortlist was announced on 15 December 2009. The longlist was announced on 17 November 2009, chosen from 115entries.

2011

The shortlist was announced 9 December 2010, chosen from a total of 123 submissions and a longlist of 16. The winners were announced on 14 March 2011, the eve of the Abu Dhabi International Book Fair. This marked the first time the award had been split, as well as the first female winner (Raja Alem).

2012
A total of 101 submissions from 15 countries were whittled down to a longlist of 13. This list was announced in November 2011. The final shortlist of six books was revealed on 11 January 2012. The winner was announced 27 March 2012.

2013

The longlist of 16 books was announced on 6 December 2012. The shortlist of six books was announced on 9 January 2013. The winner was announced on 23 April 2013.

2014
The longlist of 16 books was announced 7 January 2014. The shortlist of 6 books was announced 10 February 2014. The winner was announced 29 April 2014.

2015
The longlist. On 13 February 2015 the shortlist was announced. The winner was announced 6 May 2015.

2016
The longlist was announced on 12 January 2016. The winner was announced 26 April 2016.

2017
The winner was announced 25 April 2017.

2018
The longlist was announced on 17 January 2018. The winner was announced 24 April 2018.

2019 
The shortlist was announced on 5 February 2019, chosen from a total of 134 submissions from 9 Arab countries. The shortlist titles

2020 
The winner was announced on 14 April 2020. The shortlist was announced on 4 February 2020. The longlist was announced on 17 December 2019, chosen from 128 entries.

2021 
The longlist was chosen on 1 March 2021, chosen from 121 entries. The shortlist was announced on 29 March 2021 and the winner on 25 May 2021.

Judges
The judges since 2008 are listed below:

2008
 Feissal Darraj
 Ghalia Qabbani
 Mohammed Bennis
 Mohammed Berrada
 Paul Starkey
 Samuel Shimon

2009
 Fakhri Saleh
 Hartmut Faehndrich
 Mohammad al-Murr
 Rasheed El-Enany
 Youmna el Eid

2010
 Taleb Alrefai
 Raja' Ben Salamah
 Saif al-Rahbi
 Frédéric LaGrange

2011
 Fadhil al-Azzawi
 Munira Al-Fadhel
 Isabella Camera D'Afflitto
 Amjad Nasser
 Said Yaktine

2012
 Georges Tarabichi
 Maudie Bitar
 Hoda Elsadda
 Huda al-Naimi
 Gonzalo Fernández Parrilla

2013
 Galal Amin
 Sobhi al-Boustan
 Ali Ferzat
 Barbara Michalak-Pikulska
 Zahia Smail Salhi

2014
Saad A. Albazei (Chair)
Ahmed Alfaitouri
Zhor Gourram
Abdullah Ibrahim
Mehmet Hakki Suçin

2015
Mourid Barghouti (Chair}
Ayman A. El-Desouky
Parween Habib
Najim A. Kadhim
Kaoru Yamamoto

2019
Chair: Charafdin Majdolin, Moroccan critic and academic
Fowziya Abu Khalid, Saudi Arabian poet, writer, academic and researcher i social and political issues
Zulaikha Aburisha, Jordanian poet and activist
Latif Zeitouni, Lebanese academic and literary critic
Zhang Hong Yi, Chinese translator and researcher

2020 
Chair: Muhsin al-Musawi, an Iraqi literary critic and Professor of Classical and Modern Arabic Literature, Comparative and Cultural Studies at Columbia University
Pierre Abi Saab, a Lebanese critic, journalist and co-founder of the Lebanese Al-Akhbar newspaper
Reem Magued, an Eqyptian broadcaster, television journalist and trainer in journalism and media
Amin Zaoui, an Algerian novelist who writes in both Arabic and French, and Professor of Comparative Literature and Contemporary Thought at the Central University of Algiers
Viktoria Zarytovskaya, a Russian academic, researcher and translator of numerous works of Arabic literature into Russian including Ahmed Saadawi’s Frankenstein in Baghdad, winner of the prize in 2014

2021 
Chair: Chawki Bazih, Lebanese poet and author 
Mohammed Ait Hanna, a Moroccan writer, translator and lecturer of Philosophy at the Regional Centre for Teaching Careers and Training in Casablanca
Safa Jubran, a lecturer of Arabic Language and Modern Literature at the University of San Paolo in Brazil
Ali Al-Muqri, a Yemeni writer twice longlisted for IPAF in 2009 and 2011 respectively
Ayesha Sultan, an Emirati author, journalist, founding director of Warrak Publishing House and Vice President of the Emirates Writers Union

Statistics
As of 2020, the following authors have been nominated at least three times:

Three nominations
 Antoine Douaihy
 Inaam Kachachi
 Khaled Khalifa
 Renée Hayek
 Youssef Ziedan

Four nominations 
 Amir Tag Elsir
 Ibrahim Nasrallah
 Jabbour Douaihy
 Rabee Jaber
 Waciny Laredj

Countries

The countries with the most nominations are:
 Egypt, 34
 Lebanon, 30
 Iraq, 22
 Syria, 20

Sudan, Eritrea and the UAE have one nomination each.

IPAF Nadwa
 For details of the annual writers' workshop, see International Prize for Arabic Fiction Nadwa.

References

External links 
International Prize for Arabic Fiction, official multi-lingual site.
"Arab 'Booker' stirs up passion", by George Walden, The Jerusalem Post, Mar 12, 2008
"Prize to rekindle Arabic fiction", by Simeon Kerr, Financial Times, March 11, 2008
"Award cycle: Ipaf draws in writers while readers simply lap up winners", The Gulf Today, November 9, 2013

Arabic literary awards
Emirati literary awards
Awards established in 2008
2008 establishments in the United Arab Emirates
Fiction awards